Chomiąża may refer to the following places in Poland:

Chomiąża, Lower Silesian Voivodeship
Chomiąża, Opole Voivodeship